The Roman Catholic Diocese of Daule is a Latin Church ecclesiastical jurisdiction or diocese of the Catholic Church located in the city of Daule, Ecuador. It is a suffragan diocese in the ecclesiastical province of metropolitan Guayaquil in Ecuador.

Diocese
The diocese covers an area of the 12 cantons in the Guayas Province: Daule, Balzar, Colimes, El Empalme, Isidro Ayora, Lomas de Sargentillo, Nobol, Palestina, Pedro Carbo, Samborondón, Santa Lucía and Salitre. 

It is divided into 27 parishes and had 28 diocesan priests in 2022.

History
On 2 February 2022, Pope Francis established the Diocese of Daule, when it was split off from the Archdiocese of Guayaquil.

As its first ordinary he named Giovanni Battista Piccioli, auxiliary bishop of Guayaquil. His installation was scheduled for 31 March. On 17 March 2022, Pope Francis accepted Piccioli's resignation and named Luis Cabrera Herrera, Archbishop of Guayaquil, apostolic administrator.

Ordinaries
Giovanni Battista Piccioli (2 February 2022 – 17 March 2022)
Luís Cabrera Herrera, apostolic administrator (17 March 2022 – 25 June 2022)
Krzysztof Kudławiec (since 22 April 2022)

See also
Roman Catholicism in Ecuador

References

External links
 Profile at the Catholic Hierarchy

Roman Catholic dioceses in Ecuador
Roman Catholic Ecclesiastical Province of Guayaquil
Christian organizations established in 2022
Roman Catholic dioceses and prelatures established in the 21st century
2022 establishments in Ecuador